is a fictional character in Capcom's Darkstalkers series. Making his first appearance in Darkstalkers: The Night Warriors in 1994, he is the series' male protagonist.

Appearances

In video games
Demitri is a mighty Romanian vampire lord who shares a bitter rivalry with Morrigan Aensland following a war over the rule of the otherworldly dimension of Makai between the Maximoff and Aensland families that resulted in Demitri's banishment to the human world. To avoid human contact while recovering his strength, he protects his castle with an energy field and secludes himself inside a coffin for fifty years, emerging only in the event of a full moon or to attack intruders of his castle and consume their blood, converting them into his servants in the process. A century later, after learning of Belial Aensland's death, and again in attempt to claim Makai as his own, Demitri prepares to face off against Morrigan—Belial's daughter and current heir to the dimension's throne—but he and his castle are sucked into the newly created realm of Majigen, causing him to abort his battle with Morrigan to fight its ruler, Jedah Dohma, instead. In the plot of the first game, he is responsible for organizing the tournament between the Darkstalkers to determine the ruler of the Demon World, which attracts the attention of the alien being Pyron. Demitri and Pyron eventually face off in single combat, culminating when Demitri defeats both Pyron and his army of Huitzil (Phobos) robots.

Demitri's appearances in Capcom crossover fighting games has been limited to 2004's Capcom Fighting Evolution and SNK vs. Capcom: SVC Chaos (2005), due to the complexity of the developers having to create new sprites for all the characters in these games in order to accommodate Demitri's signature "Midnight Bliss" super move from Darkstalkers which transforms his opponents into female versions of themselves. He makes playable appearances in tactical role-players Namco × Capcom, Cross Edge, Project X Zone (where he is paired with Dante from Devil May Cry) and Project X Zone 2 (where he is paired with Morrigan).

In other media
One of the major subplots of the 1997 anime miniseries Night Warriors: Darkstalkers' Revenge focuses on Demitri's conflict with Morrigan; his castle also comes under attack by Pyron's Huitzil robots. He engages Pyron in a fierce duel and puts up a better fight than most of Pyron's previous opponents, but is ultimately defeated. He is found by Morrigan, who accepts Demitri's superior strength, and the two of them witness Pyron's defeat at Donovan's hands. In Udon Entertainment's Darkstalkers comics, Demitri is on Earth waiting to regain his strength and return to Makai to fight Belial; his first appearance therein was in Capcom Summer Special 2004.

Demitri is a central character in the 1995 American cartoon series Darkstalkers, in which he was voiced by Michael Donovan, while his backstory and physical appearance underwent many significant changes. He is illustrated with a peakish brownish-green complexion while his eyes featured red pupils early in the series before being changed to solid white. In the show's storyline, which itself strayed considerably from the games, Demitri is awakened by Pyron to be his servant and offered rewards for doing so. In the process, he forms an uneasy alliance with Morrigan under Pyron's command, though she also serves as his rival for Pyron's favor. Demitri is portrayed therein as cowardly, with his power stemming from his control of Pyron's weapons as opposed to his own strength. He seeks power from the Crystal Skull at Count Dracula's urging; thus armed, he nearly wins before being overpowered by Harry Grimoire, the show's bumbling juvenile protagonist. Demitri is additionally responsible for the noncanonical demise of Anita's parents after attacking them and consuming their blood, and is depicted as Dracula's faithful nephew; near the conclusion of the series, Dracula summons him and says that Demitri must take the reins of power as the new Lord of Vampires, as he is exhausted from his battles with Van Helsing.

Reception
The character was well received. Asked what characters do fans like the most, Darkstalkers Chronicle: The Chaos Tower producer Minae Matsukawa said "Morrigan and Demitri, the two flagship characters". GamesRadar compared Demitri's fighting style to a "supercharged evil version of Ken and Ryu (whose name isn't Akuma)" and included him among "gaming's greatest Draculas" where they compared him to "a cross between 1980s Schwarzenegger and Liberace". Demitri was included among the best and most notable vampire characters in video games in the lists compiled by 1UP.com, ABC Online, The Guardian, and Kotaku, who described him as "Phoenix Wright on steroids", as well as on similar lists by various other publications. South African gaming site G3AR rated him among their top ten video-game vampires, and said in their 2013 review of Darkstalkers Resurrection: "The world needs a little less Ryu and Ken, [and] a lot more Morrigan and Demitri". Including him in their selection of gaming's best vampires, GamesRadar stated: "This debonair bloodsucker is a true Casanova, seducing women (Morrigan included) with his devilish grin and lavish abode. As far as fighting games go, he's one of the most inviting characters in the Darkstalkers series, given that he's pretty much a carbon copy of Ryu". According to Complex, "fans of the Darkstalkers series argue that Morrigan is the true star of the series though the honor belongs to the face of the series, Demitri".

Maximoff's finishing move, "Midnight Bliss", is credited with popularizing the idea of character gender-swaps that later came to be known as Rule 63. It turns the opposing character into a defenseless maiden and drains their life, resulting in the creation of female versions of numerous fighting game characters that prompted fan art.

See also
List of Darkstalkers characters
List of fictional vampires

References

Capcom protagonists
Darkstalkers characters
Demon characters in video games
Fictional Romanian people
Male characters in video games
Male video game villains
Vampire characters in video games
Video game bosses
Video game characters introduced in 1994
Video game characters who use magic
Video game characters who can teleport
Video game mascots